Nino Tempo (born Antonino LoTempio; January 6, 1935) is an American musician, singer, and actor. He was a duet partner with his older sister April Stevens as well as the frontman for a 1970s funk band, 5th Ave. Sax.

Biography

Early life
Antonino LoTempio was born in Niagara Falls, New York (U.S.).  A musical prodigy, he learned to play the clarinet and the tenor saxophone as a child. He was a talent show winner at four years of age and appeared on television with Benny Goodman at age seven. When his family relocated to California, he was featured on the Horace Heidt radio show, performing a Benny Goodman clarinet solo.

Film
A child actor, he worked in motion pictures in such movies as 1949's The Red Pony and in 1953's The Glenn Miller Story featuring James Stewart.

Music career
He was a sought-after session musician, working as a member of the famous session band the Wrecking Crew, also working with Elkie Brooks, and recording with Maynard Ferguson (Live at the Peacock, 1956).  Via a Bobby Darin recording session, Tempo made connections with Atlantic Records and contracted with its subsidiary Atco Records.

However, Nino Tempo is known best for his 1963 duet "Deep Purple" on Atco with his sister Carol (singing under the stage name April Stevens), which scored No.1 on the Billboard Hot 100.  The song won the 1964 Grammy Award for Best Rock And Roll Recording, selling more than one million copies and earning a gold disc.

During late 1973, a little less than ten years after "Deep Purple" had topped the Hot 100, Tempo formed Nino Tempo and 5th Ave. Sax. 5th Ave. Sax had the hit "Sister James," which reached #53 on the Hot 100.  Recorded at A&M Records studio with the backing, writing, producing, and arranging of Jeff Barry, "Sister James" became one of the first instrumental disco records to score the national charts.  "Sister James" is often classified as an example of Northern Soul.

During 1975, Tempo played saxophone on John Lennon's album Rock 'n' Roll, and was a featured soloist on The Kenny Rankin Album (1976).

Voice work
In the 1980s he was a voice actor for multiple Garfield TV specials.

Discography

Singles

As sideman
With Maynard Ferguson
Dimensions (EmArcy, 1955)
With the Modern Jazz Quartet
MJQ & Friends: A 40th Anniversary Celebration (Atlantic, 1994)

See also
Nino Tempo & April Stevens.

References

External links

Nino & April Official website

1935 births
Living people
Musicians from Niagara Falls, New York
American male child actors
American clarinetists
American male film actors
American male singers
American male saxophonists
American people of Italian descent
Grammy Award winners
American session musicians
Atco Records artists
RCA Victor artists
The Wrecking Crew (music) members
21st-century American saxophonists
21st-century clarinetists
21st-century American male musicians